Charles-Auguste Questel (19 September 1807 – 30 January 1888) was a French architect and teacher. As well as designing new buildings, his projects included the preservation of historical monuments. He worked on several historical monuments included in France's first list of such structures, the list of 1840.

Biography
Born in Paris, Questel was a student of Félix Duban at the École nationale supérieure des Beaux-Arts, and took a second-place Prix de Rome in 1844.  He became a member of the Académie des Beaux-Arts in 1871.

Questel became the patron of his own atelier at the Ecole.  Among his students were Henri Paul Nénot, Ernest Sanson, James Freret, Eugène Train and the Swiss architect Alfred Friedrich Bluntschli; he was the father-in-law of French architect Honoré Daumet.

Questel died in Paris.  Upon his death the atelier was taken over by Jean-Louis Pascal.

Works
His architectural work includes:

New buildings
 the church of Saint-Paul in Nîmes built from 1835 through 1849
 the Pradier Fountain, Nîmes, 1851 (in collaboration with James Pradier)
 the Saint Anne Hospital in Paris, 1867
 Préfecture de l'Isère, Grenoble, 1861-1866
 the Library and Museum of Grenoble, 1872

Restorations
Roman aqueduct Pont du Gard 1841-1846. (World Heritage Site). 
Romanesque abbey church of St Philibert, Tournus 1841 onwards
Romanesque abbey church of Saint-Gilles 1842 onwards. (World Heritage Site)

Sources 
 Structurae page on Questel

1807 births
1888 deaths
Architects from Paris
19th-century French architects
Prix de Rome for architecture
Preservationist architects
École des Beaux-Arts alumni
Academic staff of the École des Beaux-Arts
Members of the Académie des beaux-arts
Chevaliers of the Légion d'honneur
Architects from Versailles